Gale Sherwood McLaughlin (March 2, 1933 – June 12, 2018) was a Canadian politician. Born at Seal Cove on the island of Grand Manan, he was the son of Gerald and Doris (Wilcox) McLaughlin. Previous to being elected, he worked as a merchant, lobster buyer and weir fisherman on the island. He served in the Legislative Assembly of New Brunswick from 1957 to 1960 as member of the Progressive Conservative Party of New Brunswick from the constituency of Charlotte.

References

1933 births
2018 deaths